Romildo Jorge Etcheverry (15 December 1906 – 1967) was a Paraguayan footballer that played either as a midfielder or defender. Etcheverry was part of the Paraguay national football team that participated in the 1930 FIFA World Cup. During most of his career he played for Club Rubio Ñu, Olimpia Asunción and later was transferred to Boca Juniors where he won the 1934 Argentine first division.

Etcheverry also excelled for the Paraguayan Army at the Chaco War, where he was an aviator.

References

1906 births
Year of death missing
Paraguayan people of Basque descent
Paraguayan footballers
Association football midfielders
1930 FIFA World Cup players
Club Olimpia footballers
Boca Juniors footballers
Argentine Primera División players
Expatriate footballers in Argentina
Paraguayan expatriate sportspeople in Argentina
Paraguay international footballers
Paraguayan expatriate footballers
Paraguayan aviators
Paraguayan military personnel of the Chaco War